William H. Morse State Airport  is a state-owned public-use airport located three miles (5 km) west of the central business district of Bennington, a town in Bennington County, Vermont, United States. It is also referred to as "Southwest Vermont's Airport".

Although most U.S. airports use the same three-letter location identifier for the FAA and IATA, William H. Morse State Airport is assigned DDH by the FAA but has no designation from the IATA.

Facilities and aircraft 

There are 50 aircraft based at this airport: 48% single engine, 36% multi-engine, 4% helicopters and 12% ultralights.

References

External links 
William H. Morse State Airport at Vermont Airport Directory

Airports in Vermont
Buildings and structures in Bennington, Vermont
Transportation buildings and structures in Bennington County, Vermont